In number theory, a Parshin chain is a higher-dimensional analogue of a place of an algebraic number field.

A Parshin chain of dimension s on a scheme is a finite sequence of points p0, p1, ..., ps such that pi has dimension i and each point is contained in the closure of the next one.

References

Algebraic number theory